Herman D. Crow (April 15, 1851 – October 22, 1915) was an American politician in the state of Washington. Born in Delaware, Ohio, he served in the Washington State Senate from 1899 to 1905. In 1905, he was appointed by Governor Albert E. Mead to a newly created seat on the Washington state Supreme Court, becoming chief justice in 1913. He died in office of cancer in 1915.

References

1851 births
1915 deaths
Republican Party Washington (state) state senators
Deaths from cancer in Oregon
People from Delaware, Ohio
19th-century American politicians
Justices of the Washington Supreme Court
19th-century American judges